Stoa Pitk is a populated place situated in Pima County, Arizona, United States. Its name comes from Tohono Oʼodham, where it means 'white clay'.

References

Populated places in Pima County, Arizona